Asomua Naea (born 4  April 1969) is a Samoan former boxer. He competed in the men's welterweight event at the 1988 Summer Olympics.

References

External links
 

1969 births
Living people
Samoan male boxers
Olympic boxers of Samoa
Boxers at the 1988 Summer Olympics
Commonwealth Games competitors for Samoa
Boxers at the 1990 Commonwealth Games
Place of birth missing (living people)
Welterweight boxers
20th-century Samoan people
21st-century Samoan people